is a former Japanese football player.

Club career
Omori was born in Seiyo on November 21, 1975. After graduating from high school, he joined Yokohama Marinos in 1994. He played for the club until 1996, and he played for Kashima Antlers (1997) and Kyoto Purple Sanga (1998-99). However he could hardly play in the match at both clubs. He moved to Consadole Sapporo in 2000. Although he was originally left side-back, he became a regular player as left stopper of three back defense. He moved to Cerezo Osaka in August 2004. In 2005, he moved to Tokushima Vortis was just promoted to J2 League. He lost his opportunity to play in 2007 and retired end of 2007 season.

National team career
In April 1995, Omori was selected Japan U-20 national team for 1995 World Youth Championship. He played 3 matches as left side midfielder.

Club statistics

References

External links

Official blog

1975 births
Living people
Association football people from Ehime Prefecture
Japanese footballers
Japan youth international footballers
J1 League players
J2 League players
Yokohama F. Marinos players
Kashima Antlers players
Kyoto Sanga FC players
Hokkaido Consadole Sapporo players
Cerezo Osaka players
Tokushima Vortis players
Association football defenders